Saadatabad (also Romanized as Sa‘ādatābād) is a village in Mashiz Rural District, in the Central District of Bardsir County, Kerman Province, Iran. At the 2006 census, its population was 51, in 13 families.

References 

Populated places in Bardsir County